Daniel Tawiah Opare (born 18 October 1990) is a Ghanaian professional footballer who plays as a right-back for Belgian club Seraing.

Club career

Early career
In November 2007, Opare was recognized by World Soccer as one of the "50 Most Exciting Teenagers on the Planet". He received rave reviews for using his incredible footspeed and precision crossing to great effect for the Ghana national under-17 team, the Black Starlets, at the 2007 U-17 World Cup.

On 3 July 2010, Opare left Real Madrid Castilla to sign for Belgian club Standard Liège.

On 20 May 2014, just before the 2014 FIFA World Cup, it was announced Opare had signed for Portuguese club Porto after a successful four-year stint with Standard Liège.

Augsburg
On 13 August 2015, Opare signed a three-year contract with German club FC Augsburg for an undisclosed transfer fee.

Royal Antwerp 
In July 2018 Opare signed a contract with Belgian club Royal Antwerp as a free agent after his contract with his previous team had run out.

Seraing
On 12 January 2022, Opare signed a 1.5-year contract with Seraing.

International career

Youth
2007 FIFA U-17 World Cup
A converted midfielder and skillful lateral defender, Opare initiated the Black Starlets attacking moves with surging runs and was responsible for supplying the forwards Ransford Osei and Sadick Adams with precise crosses from wide areas. At the back, he looks equally comfortable and composed. He assisted on many of Ghana's goals at the 2007 African Under-17 Championship in Togo in March 2007, as well as in the U-17 World Cup, where he was a standout in all seven matches he played in. Opare was widely regarded as the best defender at the 2007 FIFA U17 World Cup.

2009 FIFA U-20 World Cup
In September 2009, Opare was included in the Ghana national under-20 team (the Black Satellites) for the 2009 U-20 World Cup in Egypt, in which Opare had helped the Ghana team win for the first time by defeating Brazil in the finals at the Cairo International Stadium on 16 October 2009.

Senior
On 13 November 2007, three weeks after his 17th birthday, he received his first senior International call-up from Ghana's coach, Claude Le Roy for a FIFA international friendly match against Togo at the Ohene Djan Stadium in Accra, Ghana, on 18 November 2007, after another excellent display, assisting twice on a superb hat-trick by Ransford Osei against Togo's U-17 team in a junior international friendly at the same venue on Sunday, 11 November 2007.

2008 African Cup of Nations
The U-17 World Cup star was part of Ghana's squad for the 2008 African Cup of Nations. However, on 10 January 2008, Ghana's team doctor, Martin Engmann, told the media Opare had not recovered from an ankle injury he sustained in the Pre-Tournament Training Camp at the Jebel Ali Hotel Resort and Spa in Dubai, and was excluded from the squad together alongside injured teammates Matthew Amoah and captain Stephen Appiah.

2012 African Cup of Nations
In December 2011, Opare was named to the Ghana's provisional 25-man squad for the 2012 Africa Cup of Nations. In January 2012, he was selected for the tournament's 23-man squad.

Opare was never given an opportunity by the then head coach of Ghana, Goran Stevanović, to feature in any of the six matches the Ghana national team played at the 2012 African Cup of Nations.

2014 FIFA World Cup
On 2 June 2014, Opare was named in Ghana's squad for the 2014 FIFA World Cup. In the team's opening match, he started at right-back against the United States in a 2–1 defeat, however he did not appear in their other two matches as Ghana failed to advance past the group stage.

Career statistics

Club

International

Honours 
CS Sfaxien
 CAF Confederation Cup: 2008

Standard Liège
 Belgian Cup: 2011

Ghana U-20
 FIFA U-20 World Cup: 2009

References

External links
 
 

1990 births
Living people
Association football defenders
Ghanaian footballers
Ghanaian expatriate footballers
Ghana Premier League players
Belgian Pro League players
Primeira Liga players
Süper Lig players
Bundesliga players
Ligue 2 players
Ashanti Gold SC players
CS Sfaxien players
Real Madrid Castilla footballers
Standard Liège players
FC Porto players
Beşiktaş J.K. footballers
FC Augsburg players
Royal Antwerp F.C. players
RC Lens players
S.V. Zulte Waregem players
R.F.C. Seraing (1922) players
Expatriate footballers in Tunisia
Expatriate footballers in Spain
Expatriate footballers in Belgium
Expatriate footballers in Portugal
Expatriate footballers in Turkey
Expatriate footballers in Germany
Expatriate footballers in France
Ghanaian expatriate sportspeople in Tunisia
Ghanaian expatriate sportspeople in Spain
Ghanaian expatriate sportspeople in Belgium
Ghanaian expatriate sportspeople in Portugal
Ghanaian expatriate sportspeople in Germany
Ghanaian expatriate sportspeople in France
Ghana international footballers
Ghana under-20 international footballers
2012 Africa Cup of Nations players
2014 FIFA World Cup players